Dragoş Coman (born October 16, 1980 in Bucharest) is an international freestyle swimmer from Romania, who represented his native country at three consecutive Summer Olympics, starting in 2000 in Sydney, Australia.

A year earlier, at the European LC Championships 1999 in Istanbul, he won his first medal: a silver one at the 1500 m freestyle. He also won the  bronze medal at the 2003 World Championships in Barcelona, in the 400 m freestyle, only being surpassed by Thorpe and Hackett. He is Romania's top swimmer in the 400 and 1500 m freestyle races, winning European Junior gold medals, and several medals in European and world championships. Also he is titleholder in both 400 and 1500 m freestyle, at the World Military Games, winning medals at every edition.

References

External links 
 Profile on Romanian Olympic Committee

1980 births
Living people
Olympic swimmers of Romania
Romanian male freestyle swimmers
Sportspeople from Bucharest
Swimmers at the 2000 Summer Olympics
Swimmers at the 2004 Summer Olympics
Swimmers at the 2008 Summer Olympics
World Aquatics Championships medalists in swimming
Medalists at the FINA World Swimming Championships (25 m)
European Aquatics Championships medalists in swimming
Universiade medalists in swimming
Universiade gold medalists for Romania
Universiade silver medalists for Romania
Universiade bronze medalists for Romania
Medalists at the 2001 Summer Universiade
20th-century Romanian people
21st-century Romanian people